Rudolf Schwander (23 December 1868 – 25 December 1950) was a German politician and social reformer. He was, among other things, the Mayor of Strasbourg and High Commissioner of Hesse-Nassau.

Life 
Born in Alsace, Rudolf Schwander was the son of Anne Barbe Schwander and, according to widespread rumour, the Mayors of Colmar, Camille Schlumberger. After attending elementary school and special school, Schwander first worked as a clerk and office assistant in his native town of Colmar, but graduated from high school at the same time. Between 1897 and 1901 he studied law and political science in Strasbourg and received his doctorate in political science with a thesis on French Poverty.

He entered the city service in 1900 and took over the management of the poor and hospital administration, two years later he also became a deputy of Strasbourg. Influenced by Friedrich Naumann, he subsequently carried out groundbreaking social reforms and established the Strasbourg system in 1905. Local authorities – so-called Poor offices – have been given the task of screening residents for their needs and deciding whether they are entitled to public support unlike under the Elberfeld system where they would receive support from volunteers alone. While female volunteers were responsible for on-site advice and evaluation, full-time male employees were responsible for the assessments in the administrative offices. By abolishing the Elberfield System, Schwander took the first step towards professional social assistance.

A year later, Schwander was appointed mayor of Strasbourg. As such, in April 1908 he oversaw the marriage of Elly Knapp, who was born in Strasbourg and whom he had supported earlier, with Naumann's close associate Theodor Heuss.  A brief interlude as acting state secretary in the Reich Economics Office in 1917 was followed in June 1918 by his return to Strasbourg City Hall. From 1911, he was a member of the 1st Chamber of the Landtag of Alsace-Lorraine. In October 1918 he became Reichsstatthalter in Alsace–Lorraine, but was unable to prevent its subsequent separation from the Reich after the war.

References 

1950 deaths
1868 births
German social reformers
Mayors of Strasbourg
People from Colmar